Epicrocis sahariensis is a species of snout moth in the genus Epicrocis. It was described by Rothschild in 1921. It is found in Niger, Ethiopia, Iran, Jordan, the Palestinian Territories and the United Arab Emirates.

References

Phycitini
Moths described in 1921
Snout moths of Africa
Moths of Africa
Moths of the Middle East
Fauna of Jordan
Flora of Palestine (region)
Invertebrates of the Arabian Peninsula